Josef Harpe (21 September 1887 – 14 March 1968) was a German general during World War II who commanded the 9th Army. He was a recipient of the Knight's Cross of the Iron Cross with Oak Leaves and Swords of Nazi Germany.

Harpe served on the Eastern Front, where he commanded XXXXI Panzer Corps and the 9th Army. From September 1944 to January 1945 Army Group A, when he was relieved of his command due to the inability of German forces to stop the Soviet Vistula–Oder Offensive. He ended the war commanding the 5th Panzer Army on Western Front.

Harpe was also responsible for establishing the Ozarichi death camps, which is considered by historians to be one of the worst atrocities committed by the Wehrmacht.

Military career and war crimes
Harpe joined the Prussian Army on 28 September 1909 and fought in World War I. After the war, Harpe remained in the Reichswehr military service. In 1931, under the pseudonym Direktor Hacker, he held a position in the secret German-Russian Tank-School (Kama tank school) in Kazan, Soviet Union. He was promoted to Oberstleutnant on 1 August 1934 and became commander of Panzer-Regiment 3 on 15 October 1935. He was again promoted on 1 January 1937, and commanded the German 1st Panzer Brigade holding the rank of Oberst. In 1940 he took over as Commandant of the Armoured Troops School No.2 in Wünsdorf. 

He served on the Eastern Front, where he commanded, from July 1942 until October 1943 the XXXXI Panzerkorps and from September 1944 to January 1945 Army Group A. On 12 March 1944, Harpe established the makeshift Ozarichi death camps in Belarus. There were no buildings or sanitary facilities; it was just a massive closed-off area with barbed wire. Soldiers of the 35th Infantry Division, led by Johann-Georg Richert, who was reinforced by additional troops from Sonderkommando 7b of Einsatzgruppe B, forced at least 40,000 civilians into the camp, shooting at least 400 of them along the way after they became too weak to continue walking. The prisoners were mostly family members of slave laborers, children under 13, the sick, mothers with infants, and the elderly. These people were viewed by the Germans as useless.

The prisoners, many of whom had contracted typhus, had to survive in the open in the marshlands without shelter medical aid, food, or water. "There was a gate with barbed wire, small watch towers with soldiers and German shepherds, but nothing else," recalled one survivor, Larisa Stashkevich. She said that anyone who even attempted to light a campfire was immediately gunned down. The only way to keep warm was to use the corpses of murdered prisoners.

Dieter Pohl has called the establishment of the camp "one of the worst crimes the Wehrmacht ever committed against civilians". By the time troops of the 65th Army of the First Belorussian Front liberated those in camps on 19 March 1944, at least 9000 people had died. The German high command celebrated the thousands of deaths as a success, calling the civilians "useless mouths" The troops freed 33,480 people, including 15,960 children under the age of 13, from the Ozarichi concentration camps.

He was relieved of his command due to the inability of German forces to stop the Soviet Vistula–Oder Offensive, which resulted in the Soviet capture of most of Poland. He ended the war as the commander of the 5th Panzer Army on the Western Front. Harpe was taken prisoner by the United States Army on 17 April 1945. Although Harpe was held as a prisoner of war by the United States, he was never charged with any crimes. He was released from custody on 14 April 1948, and died a free man in 1968.

Although Harpe never faced prosecution for the Ozarichi camps, Johann-Georg Richert did. He was prosecuted by a Soviet military court in the Minsk Trial for his role in the deportations and other atrocities against Soviet civilians. Richert was sentenced to death, and hanged in 1946.

Awards
 Iron Cross (1914) 2nd Class (21 September 1914) & 1st Class (3 September 1915)
 Wound Badge (1914) in Black (20 May 1918)
 Wehrmacht Long Service Award 1st Class (2 October 1936)
 Clasp to the Iron Cross (1939) 2nd and 1st Class
 Knight's Cross on 13 August 1941 as Generalmajor and commander of the 12. Panzer-Division
 Oak Leaves on 31 December 1941 as Generalmajor and commander of the 12. Panzer-Division
 Swords on 15 September 1943 as General der Panzertruppe and commanding general of the XXXXI. Panzerkorps
 German Cross in Gold on 19 February 1943 as General der Panzertruppe and commanding general of the XXXXI.Panzerkorps

References
Citations

Bibliography

 
 
 
 

1887 births
1968 deaths
Holocaust perpetrators in Belarus
People from the Province of Westphalia
German Army officers of World War II
Colonel generals of the German Army (Wehrmacht)
Grand Officers of the Order of the Crown (Romania)
Recipients of the Gold German Cross
Recipients of the clasp to the Iron Cross, 1st class
Recipients of the Knight's Cross of the Iron Cross with Oak Leaves and Swords
German prisoners of war in World War II held by the United States
Prussian Army personnel
German Army personnel of World War I
Reichswehr personnel
Military personnel from Gelsenkirchen